The World Gold Council is the market development organisation for the gold industry. It works across all parts of the industry, from gold mining to investment, with the aim of stimulating and sustaining demand for gold.

They frequently publish research that demonstrates gold’s strength as a preserver of wealth – both for investors and countries. They also provide analysis of the industry, offering insights into the drivers of gold demand. They have also launched various products such as SPDR Gold Shares and gold accumulation plans in India and China.

The World Gold Council is an association whose members comprise the world’s leading gold mining companies. It helps to support its members to mine in a responsible way and developed the Conflict Free Gold Standard.

Headquartered in London, United Kingdom, they have offices in India, China, Singapore and the United States.
David Harquail became new president.
WGC appoints David Tait as the CEO.

References

External links
 

Gold mining
International organisations based in London
Gold
Organisations based in the City of London
Organizations established in 1987
Jewellery
Investment
Operations of central banks
Mining trade associations